The 2023 Islamabad local government elections or the 2023 Islamabad local bodies election, will be held in the Islamabad Capital Territory. Around one million voters will choose their representatives in the federal capital's long-delayed local government elections, according to a schedule released by the Election Commission of Pakistan.

The candidates for the Pakistan Muslim League (N) (PML-N) and Pakistan Tehreek-e-Insaf (PTI) sparred a lot during the most recent elections, which were conducted in 2015. The PML-N won the elections, and Sheikh Anser Aziz was later elected as Islamabad's first mayor. Aziz later resigned in 2020 and was replaced by Pir Adil Gillani.

Background 
Elections in Islamabad were long overdue since the Islamabad Metropolitan Corporation, the city's previous municipal administration, finished its five-year term in February 2021. The government and the Election Commission of Pakistan (ECP) both failed to hold the elections within the required four months. The ECP has finally released the election timetable for Islamabad's 101 Union Councils (UCs) after an egregious delay. The number of UCs has now been expanded by the government from 50 to 101 due to Islamabad’s population increase according to the 2017 census.

On 23 December 2022, the Senate passed a bill that increased the number of UCs from 101 to 125. On 27 December 2022, a five member bench of the ECP, headed by the Chief Election Commissioner, conducted a hearing which concluded in the postponement of the elections “for the time being”. Because of the increase in the number of UCs, the ECP would have to conduct fresh delimitations and redo the whole election process, which would at least take 4 months. On 30 December 2022, the Islamabad High Court (IHC) accepted identical petitions filed by the PTI and Jamaat-e-Islami (JI) set aside the ECP’s order of postponement of the elections and directed it to hold the elections as per schedule, that is on 31 December 2022.

However, elections were not held on 31 December 2022, despite lines of voters outside polling stations. The ECP stated it would be “practically impossible” to hold the elections on such a short notice and subsequently filed an intra-court appeal against the IHC’s decision. Concurrently, the PTI filed a petition in the IHC seeking contempt of court proceedings against the ECP for not holding the elections.

On 15 February 2023, the IHC sought a fresh schedule for the elections from the ECP after Parliament increased the number of UCs from 101 to 125.

Seat allocation 
The local government election in Islamabad Capital Territory consists of 101 Union Councils and 1 Metropolitan Corporation Islamabad.

Elections 
Pakistan Muslim League (N) (PML-N), Pakistan Tehreek-e-Insaf (PTI), and Pakistan Peoples Party (PPP) are the political parties that are most likely to compete against one another in the elections. The PPP is a strong electoral force in Islamabad and works with the PML-N in the federal government's alliance. In order to defeat the PTI, there is a likelihood that these two parties will run united candidates in numerous Union Councils.

See also 
2015 Islamabad local government elections

References 

Local elections in Pakistan
Loc
Islamabad
December 2022 events in Pakistan